Hadlow Preparatory School is a state-integrated Anglican primary school in High Street, Masterton, New Zealand.

History
Hadlow opened as a boarding (40 boys) and a day school (20 boys) for boys aged 8 to 14 at the beginning of 1929 under principal and founder A. W. Don. At the first break-up ceremony the prizes went to the sons of major Wairarapa landowners.

The school was purchased by Anglican girls school, St Matthew's, on Mr Don's untimely death in 1954  and Mr John Woodward Bird 1892—1970, a senior master at Wairarapa College, was appointed principal.

On Mr Bird's retirement Mr John Kenneth Louisson 1918—2001 was appointed headmaster in 1961.

References

Educational institutions established in 1929
Masterton
Schools in the Wairarapa
Anglican schools in New Zealand
1929 establishments in New Zealand